Marshall "Little Sleepy" Glenn (April 22, 1908 – October 11, 1983) was a player and coach of American football and basketball and a physician.  He served as the head football coach at West Virginia University from 1937 to 1939, compiling a record of 14–12–3, and the school's head basketball coach from 1933 to 1938, tallying a mark of 61–46.  Glenn was born on April 22, 1908 in Elkins, West Virginia.  He died on October 11, 1983 at Washington Country Hospital in Hagerstown, Maryland from injuries sustained in a car accident  on U.S. Route 340. While attending West Virginia University he was a member of Sigma Phi Epsilon.

Head coaching record

Football

Basketball

  In the 1934–35 season, West Virginia finished the Eastern Intercollegiate Conference season with a record of 6–2, tied for first place with Pittsburgh.West Virginia subsequently lost to Pittsburgh in a conference championship playoff game, not included in West Virginia's regular-season conference won-lost record.

References

External links
 

1908 births
1983 deaths
All-American college men's basketball players
American football quarterbacks
American men's basketball players
Basketball coaches from West Virginia
Basketball players from West Virginia
People from Charles Town, West Virginia
People from Elkins, West Virginia
Physicians from West Virginia
Players of American football from West Virginia
West Virginia Mountaineers football coaches
West Virginia Mountaineers football players
West Virginia Mountaineers men's basketball coaches
West Virginia Mountaineers men's basketball players
Road incident deaths in Maryland